The One Bermuda Alliance (OBA) is one of two political parties in Bermuda with elected members of the Bermuda's legislative assembly. It was created in May 2011 by the merger of most members of Bermuda's two non-Labour parties, the United Bermuda Party and the Bermuda Democratic Alliance. It won the 2012 election and governed until 2017.  Since then, it has been the official opposition in Bermuda's Assembly (currently holding 6 of the Assembly's 36 seats). Since November 2020, the leader of the party has been N.H. Cole Simons.

History
The United Bermuda Party (UBP) was founded in 1964 and won every Bermuda election until 1998, when it lost to the Progressive Labour Party. The UBP remained the official opposition party until 2011.

The Bermuda Democratic Alliance (BDA) was formed in 2009 by breakaway members of the UBP that believed only a new party could win voters from the PLP. It contested one by-election in December 2010, coming in third behind the PLP and UBP, with the PLP retaining about the same support level that it had in the 2007 general election. Concern that vote-splitting among the two non-Labour parties would result in an easy victory for the PLP prompted the BDA and UBP to enter merger talks.

The initial intention of UBP and BDA negotiators was to formally merge the two parties, but when UBP leader Kim Swan sought an injunction to block the merger, seven sitting MPs of the UBP quit their former party and joined the three BDA members to become Bermuda's new official opposition on 17 May 2011.

The party held its inaugural leadership convention on 10 September 2011, where the former BDA leader, Senator Craig Cannonier, narrowly won the party leadership over challenger Everard T. (Bob) Richards. The party won the 2012 elections, taking 19 of the 36 seats in the House of Assembly.

Cannonier resigned party leadership on 19 May 2014, and Michael Dunkley became party leader and Premier. The party lost its parliamentary majority in March 2017 after two members left the party to become independents, and Dunkley called an election for 18 July 2017. The party lost 7 seats to the PLP, retaining 12 of the 36 seats, and prompting Dunkley to resign as party leader the following day. Jeanne Atherden became the new leader but resigned in September 2018 after internal dissension, with Craig Cannonier returning as leader.

After the party retained only 6 seats in the 2020 Bermudian general election, Cannonier resigned as party leader in October 2020. N.H. Cole Simons was later sworn in as party leader on 2 November 2020, having been the only candidate for the role.

Policies
The party's initial slogan was "Putting Bermuda First." Its policies on its foundation included:
 balancing the budget in its first term
 cutting Ministerial pay by at least 10%
 allocating more government contracts to small business
 additional resources for police
 introducing a fully integrated technical curriculum and a longer school day
 having fixed term elections, right to petition for referendums and recall of MPs.

Party leaders

Election results

References

External links
 Official website

Conservative parties in North America
Political parties in Bermuda
Political parties established in 2011
2011 establishments in Bermuda
Conservative parties in British Overseas Territories